The Times-News is a US daily newspaper serving the Twin Falls, Idaho, area.

Description
The paper has a circulation of 19,431 daily, 21,059 Sunday. It is owned by Lee Enterprises. The paper is available throughout the Magic Valley region of south-central Idaho as well as in parts of Elko County, Nevada, as far south as Wells.

The Times-News began publication in 1904 as the Twin Falls Weekly News.

The paper was acquired by Howard Publications in 1968,(2 April 1968). Indiana Firm Buys Paper In Twin Falls, The Idaho Daily Statesman, p. 1 (paywall)  Howard was acquired by Lee Enterprises in 2002.

Publications
 The Times-News daily newspaper
 Magic Values Shopper & Auto Trader weekly free ads paper
 AG Weekly weekly agricultural news
 Southern Idaho Business Online, Online local business news

Editors 
 2015 to 2018 Matt Christensen 
 2018 - 2022 Alison Smith 
 2022-present Steve Kiggins

See also

 List of newspapers in Idaho

References

External links
 
 
 Southern Idaho Business Online
 AG Weekly
 Lee Enterprises

Newspapers published in Idaho
Twin Falls, Idaho
Daily newspapers published in the United States
Publications established in 1904
1904 establishments in Idaho
Lee Enterprises publications